Mantachie Creek is a stream in the U.S. state of Mississippi.

According to tradition, Mantachie is named after a Chickasaw chieftain. A variant name is "Mataches Creek".

References

Rivers of Mississippi
Rivers of Itawamba County, Mississippi
Rivers of Lee County, Mississippi
Mississippi placenames of Native American origin